Westfield is a civil parish in Kings County, New Brunswick, Canada.

For governance purposes it is divided between the town of Grand Bay-Westfield and the local service district of the parish of Westfield, both of which are members of the Fundy Regional Service Commission (FRSC). Westfield includes the taxing authorities of Westfield East and Westfield West, which are sometimes erroneously described as LSDs in their own right.

Origin of name
The parish may have been named for the town of Westfield in Massachusetts.

Notable is that the names of Kings County's pre-1800 parishes all occur in both New Jersey and North Carolina.

History
Westfield was erected in 1786 as one of the original parishes of the county.

The 1795 reorganisation of the county affected the boundary on the Kingston Peninsula.

In 1896 the boundary on the Long Reach side of the Kingston Peninsula was altered slightly.

Boundaries
Westfield Parish is bounded:

 on the northwest by the Queens County line;
 on the northeast by a line beginning on the Queens County line at a point about 300 metres northeasterly of the northern end of Mud Lake, then southeasterly along the prolongation of the line dividing two grants at the mouth of Devils Back Brook to the Saint John River, then across the river to the Kingston Peninsula, at a point about 1.2 kilometres north of Williams Lake, then southeasterly along the line between two grants to Robert and Caleb Merrit and its prolongation to the rear line of a tier of grants along the Kennebecasis River, then southwesterly along the rear line of the tier and its prolongation to a point about 375 metres east of Milkish Creek, then southeasterly along the southwestern line of a grant to Stephen Baxter and its prolongation to the Saint John County line;
 on the southeast by the Saint John county line in the Kennebecasis River;
 on the west by Charlotte County line;
 including Kennebecasis Island and nearby small islands.

Communities
Communities at least partly within the parish. bold indicates an incorporated municipality

 Bayswater
 Blagdon
 Carters Point
 Cheyne Settlement
 Crystal Beach
 Days Landing
 Hardings Point
 Keatings Corner

 Lands End
 Milkish
 Morrisdale
 Public Landing
 Sand Point
  Summerville
 Sunset Valley
 Woodmans Point

 Grand Bay-Westfield
 Epworth Park
 Grand Bay
 Hillandale
 Ingleside
 Ingleside Heights
 Lingley

 Grand Bay-Westfield
  Nerepis
 Ononette
  Pamdenec
 Westfield
 Westfield Beach
 Westfield Centre

Bodies of water
Bodies of water at least partly within the parish.

 Kennebecasis River
 Milkish Channel
 Nerepis River
  Saint John River
 West Branch Musquash River
 Brittains Creek

 Cunningham Creek
 Goose Creek
 Milkish Creek
 Rancliffe Creek
 more than forty officially named lakes

Islands
Islands at least partly within the parish.
 Kennebecasis Island
 Ram Island

Other notable places
Parks, historic sites, and other noteworthy places at least partly within the parish.
 Lepreau River Game Management Area
 Loch Alva Protected Natural Area

Demographics
Parish population total does not include Grand Bay-Westfield

Population
Population trend

Language
Mother tongue (2016)

Access Routes
Highways and numbered routes that run through the parish, including external routes that start or finish at the parish limits:

Highways

Principal Routes

Secondary Routes:

External Routes:
None

See also
List of parishes in New Brunswick

Notes

References

External links
 Town of Grand Bay-Westfield

Local service districts of Kings County, New Brunswick
Parishes of Kings County, New Brunswick